Noor-ul-Ain "Annie" Khalid (Punjabi) is a Pakistani-born British singer and model. She rose to fame in Pakistan in 2006, after releasing the single "Mahiya"; the song was used in the Indian film Awarapan (2007) and became the most-played Pakistani song of 2005, 2006 and 2007.

Early life 
Khalid was born in Lahore on 27 March 1987, to a father of Kashmiri descent and a mother of Yemeni descent. When she was six months old, the family left Pakistan and moved to East London; several years later, they moved to Essex.

Career

Music
Her first single, "Mahiya" became a massive hit in Pakistan, following its release in 2005. It was later used in the Indian film Awarapan.

On 25 November 2010, Khalid released her UK debut single "Be My Baby" along with the remix of the track done by British DJ Judge Jules. After meeting at a charity function, Khalid collaborated with the English–Norwegian boy band A1 for a single "Just 3 Words" and went on tour with them, performing in Norway and the UK. In 2011, Khalid was nominated as Best Female Singer at the Pakistan Media Awards.

In September 2013, she released the single "Boom Boom Danze" with Beenie Man.

Modeling
She walked at the 2010 L'Oréal Karachi fashion week for BNS couture and in 2011 for Ammar Belal. She was featured in LOOK magazine in June 2011. The same month, she launched a café in Lahore, the AK Lounge.

Charity
She was appointed Norway's Red Cross Goodwill ambassador in 2011, after her efforts fundraising for Pakistani flood victims.

Personal life
She married Malik Noureed Awan in July 2012 in Lahore, but the couple later divorced. On 26 December 2014, Annie Khalid married Saad Ahmed Khan in Lahore, Pakistan. They have a daughter.

Discography

Albums

Singles
 "Mahiya" Remix - Awarapan (2007)
 "Tenu Takiya", featuring RnB (2008)
 "Just Three Words", featuring A1 (2012)
 "Vari Vari Jawan" "Humvee Assault" (2013)
 "Vote For Change" PTI Song (2014) 
 "Boom Boom Danze", featuring Beenie Man Brand Ambassador (2014)
 "Kya Yehi Pyaar Hai"  Bahadurabad (2014)
 "Tujhe Yaad Kiya" "Saada Haq Ithe Rakh"(2014)
 "Tharki Saala" "The Profligator" (2014)
 "Tu Wo To Nahi" "Gunstar Heroes" (2014)
 "Party Karlo" "Jaan e Jaan" Overkill Mafia (2015)
 "Be My Baby", Golden Axe (2015)
 "Princess" Jet Set Radio (2015)
 "Listen (Tujh Se Meri Jaan Hai)" Binary Domain (2015)
 "Kali Raat" Young Tarang (2016)
 "Do You See Me" Robot 2 (2015)

See also

 List of Pakistani musicians
 List of people from Lahore

References

External links 

 
 

1987 births
Living people
21st-century English women singers
21st-century English singers
Businesspeople from Lahore
English dance musicians
English women pop singers
English people of Azad Kashmiri descent
English people of Pakistani descent
English people of Yemeni descent
Naturalised citizens of the United Kingdom
Pakistani dance musicians
Pakistani emigrants to the United Kingdom
Pakistani female models
Pakistani women singers
Pakistani people of Kashmiri descent
Pakistani people of Yemeni descent
Pakistani pop singers
Punjabi people
Singers from Essex
Singers from Lahore
Singers from London